Mulakuppadam Films is an Indian film production and distribution company founded by businessman Tomichan Mulakuppadam. Formed in 2007, head office of Mulakuppadam Films is situated in Kochi, Kerala.

History 
Mulakuppadam Films debuted in film production through the 2007 Malayalam film Flash, directed by Sibi Malayil starred Mohanlal in lead role. They distributed Malayalam films Minnaminnikoottam and Lollipop in 2008 through Mulakuppadam Release.

Mulakuppadam Films got a break through the 2010 Malayalam film Pokkiri Raja, directed by Vysakh which starred Mammootty and Prithviraj Sukumaran in lead roles. The film was made on a budget of 7.80 crores, the gross collection was 13 crores. It became highest-grossing Malayalam film of 2010.

The production of Pulimurugan, directed by Vysakh and starring Mohanlal and Jagapathi Babu in lead role, started in mid-2015. The film was made for a budget of  25 crore, making it one of the most expensive Malayalam films until then. The film was a records breaker at the box office and eventually became the highest-grossing Malayalam film in history. Until 7 November 2016, the film grossed 105 crore worldwide, thus Pulimurugan became the first Malayalam film to gross 100 crore at the box office. It has grossed more than 152 crore worldwide, it establishing the first "100 crore club" and "150 crore club" in the Malayalam film industry.

In 2017, their next production Ramaleela directed by debutant Arun Gopy and starring Dileep was released.
 
In 2021, their next production "Ottakomban'
directed by Mathew Thomas and starring Suresh Gopi this film was in post-production work.

Mulakuppadam Release
The films produced are distributed through Mulakuppadam Release which is the associated distribution company formed with Mulakuppadam Films.

Films

Production

Distribution
Following are the list of films he distributed other than the films he produced.

References

External links
 
 Official Youtube

Film distributors of India
Film production companies of Kerala
Companies based in Kochi
Indian companies established in 2007
2007 establishments in Kerala
Mass media companies established in 2007